Aprilia Marzuki (born 21 April 1978) is an Indonesian judoka. She competed in the women's middleweight event at the 2000 Summer Olympics.

References

1978 births
Living people
Indonesian female judoka
Olympic judoka of Indonesia
Judoka at the 2000 Summer Olympics
Place of birth missing (living people)